The Human Condition is the nineteenth studio album by Canadian rock band Saga. It is notable for being their only studio album on which the group’s original lead vocalist, Michael Sadler, does not appear. He was briefly replaced by Rob Moratti.

Track listing
All songs written by Saga.

Credits
Rob Moratti – vocals
Ian Crichton – guitars
Jim Crichton – bass, keyboards
Jim Gilmour – keyboards, vocals
Brian Doerner – drums

References

2009 albums
Saga (band) albums
SPV/Steamhammer albums
Inside Out Music albums